Carolliinae is a subfamily of bats.

Classification
Subfamily Carolliinae
Genus: Carollia - Short-tailed Leaf-nosed Bats
Benkeith's short-tailed Bat, Carollia benkeithi
Silky Short-tailed Bat, Carollia brevicauda
Chestnut Short-tailed Bat, Carollia castanea
Colombian Short-tailed Bat, Carollia colombiana
Manu short-tailed Bat, Carollia manu
Carollia monohernandezi
Seba's Short-tailed Bat, Carollia perspicillata
Sowell's Short-tailed Bat, Carollia sowelli
Gray Short-tailed Bat, Carollia subrufa
Genus: Rhinophylla
Hairy Little Fruit Bat, Rhinophylla alethina
Fischer's Little Fruit Bat, Rhinophylla fischerae
Dwarf Little Fruit Bat, Rhinophylla pumilio

References

Phyllostomidae
Mammal subfamilies
Taxa named by Gerrit Smith Miller Jr.